Jayakumar Jayavardhan (born 29 May 1987) known as J. Jayavardhan is an Indian politician and was a Member of Parliament elected from Tamil Nadu. He was elected to the Lok Sabha from Chennai South constituency as an All India Anna Dravida Munnetra Kazhagam candidate in 2014 election. He completed his undergraduate studies at Sri Ramachandra Medical College and Research Institute and is a doctor by profession. Dr J Jayavardhan has become the youngest MP in India by winning the seat from South Chennai, Tamil Nadu at the young age of 26.

His father D. Jayakumar is a former MLA in Royapuram constituencyChennai and Former minister of fisheries in ADMK government and was also Speaker of the Tamil Nadu Assembly for a year (2011 - 2012), besides being the minister for fisheries in the first J. Jayalalithaa government of 1991–1996.

References 

All India Anna Dravida Munnetra Kazhagam politicians
Living people
India MPs 2014–2019
Lok Sabha members from Tamil Nadu
1987 births
20th-century Indian medical doctors
Medical doctors from Chennai
Politicians from Chennai